Dexter Regional Airport is a public use airport in Penobscot County, Maine, United States. It is owned by the Town of Dexter and is located three nautical miles (5.56 km) east of the central business district.

Facilities and aircraft 
It has two runways designated 16/34 with an asphalt surface measuring 3,009 by 80 feet (917 x 24 m) and 7/25 with a turf surface measuring 1,250 by 120 feet (381 x 37 m)

For the 12-month period ending August 10, 2008, the airport had 6,963 aircraft operations, an average of 19 per day: 100% general aviation with a few ultralights. At that time there were 35 aircraft based at this airport: 86% single-engine, 9% ultralights, 3% multi-engine, and 3% helicopters.

References

External links 
 Aerial photo as of 27 May 1996 from USGS The National Map
 
 

Airports in Penobscot County, Maine
Dexter, Maine